Bouncin' Back is a studio album by American country artist Janie Fricke. It was released on October 10, 2000, via JMF Records and contained 12 tracks. It was the nineteenth studio collection of Fricke's career and the first released on her own record label (JMF). The project was also Fricke's first album of new material since 1993.

Background, content and release

Janie Fricke has been considered among journalists as one of country music's most successful female artists during the 1980s. She had a series of number one and top ten country songs during the decade. In the 1990s, she left her long-time label and recorded for the smaller Intersound Records. Her last record for the company was 1993's Now & Then. In 2000, Fricke launched her own record company titled JMF Records where she would release Bouncin' Back.

The album was recorded at The Tracking Station, a studio located in Nashville, Tennessee. The sessions for the project were solely produced by Fricke. It was her third album to be self-produced. In the album's liner notes, Fricke dedicated the project to her fans: "Thank you to all my special fans and friends who have my made my music a reality. This project is dedicated to each and every one of you!"

Bouncin' Back consisted of 12 tracks. All of the disc's material were new recordings including a self-penned track by Fricke herself called "Love Forever More". Bouncin' Back was released on October 10, 2000, through JMF Records. It was Fricke's first release for her own record label and the nineteenth studio album in her career overall. It was originally distributed as both a compact disc and a cassette. At the time of its release, Fricke used the internet to sell the album and market it to her fans. AllMusic later reviewed the project and gave it three out of five stars.

Track listings

Compact disc version

Cassette version

Personnel
All credits are adapted from the liner notes of Bouncin' Back and AllMusic.

Musical personnel
 Danny Bailey – Background vocals
 Brian Barnett – Musician
 Mark Basden – Musician
 Lea Jane Berinati – Background vocals
 Glenn Duncan – Musician
 Janie Fricke – Lead vocals 
 Kerry Marx – Musician
 Russ Pahl – Musician
 Mark Prentice – Musician
 Judy Rodman – Background vocals
 Steven Sheehan – Musician
 Catherine Styron – Musician
 Dennis Wilson – Background vocals

Technical personnel
 Danny Bailey – Engineer
 Melanie Briley – Clothing
 Hector Cantu – Assistant
 Dan Carter – Photography
 Janie Fricke – Producer 
 Roger Triche – Make-up

Release history

References

2000 albums
Albums produced by Janie Fricke
Janie Fricke albums